Jacob Harris (born April 16, 1997) is an American football wide receiver who is a free agent. He played college football at UCF.

High school career 
Born in Palm Harbor, Florida, Harris attended and played high school football at Palm Harbor University. He did not play organized football until his senior year of high school. He was recruited by NCAA Division I programs to play college soccer.

College career
Harris originally walked on at Western Kentucky, redshirting his freshman year. He then transferred back to his home state and joined the UCF Knights football team. He played in all 13 games in both the 2018 and 2019 seasons, recording 448 yards and 1 touchdown on 19 receptions in 2019. In his 2020 senior campaign, Harris racked up 30 receptions gaining 539 yards and scoring 8 touchdowns (3rd most in the AAC).

Professional career

Harris was drafted by the Los Angeles Rams in the fourth round (141st pick) of the 2021 NFL Draft. He signed his four-year rookie contract with the Rams on June 4, 2021.

On November 9, 2021, Harris was placed on injured reserve after suffering a season-ending ACL and MCL injury in Week 9. Without Harris, the Rams won Super Bowl LVI against the Cincinnati Bengals. On July 28, 2022, Harris converted from tight end to wide receiver.

On August 30, 2022, Harris was waived by the Rams and signed to the practice squad the next day. He was elevated to the active roster on September 17, 2022, and reverted back to the practice squad after the game. He was once again elevated to the active roster a week later, and reverted back to the practice squad after the game. He was promoted to the active roster on November 19, 2022. He was placed on injured reserve on December 12, 2022.

References

External links
UCF bio

1997 births
Living people
Los Angeles Rams players
People from Palm Harbor, Florida
Players of American football from Florida
Sportspeople from Pinellas County, Florida
UCF Knights football players
American football wide receivers